Webber Township may refer to the following places:

 Webber Township, Jefferson County, Illinois
 Webber Township, Lake County, Michigan

See also

Webber (disambiguation)

Township name disambiguation pages